Ratt & Roll 8191 is a compilation album collecting most of the biggest hits from 1983 to 1991 by the American glam metal band Ratt. It charted at #57 and remained a consistent seller in the group's catalogue. Sales were at around 700,000 units by 2002 when another compilation, The Essentials, was released.

Track listing

Charts

Certifications

References

Ratt albums
Albums produced by Beau Hill
1991 compilation albums
Atlantic Records compilation albums